Erigeron modestus  is a North American species of flowering plant in the family Asteraceae known by the common name plains fleabane. It native to northern Mexico (Coahuila, Chihuahua, Nuevo León) and the southwestern and south-central parts of the United States (Arizona, New Mexico, Texas, Oklahoma, Kansas).

Erigeron modestus  is a branching perennial herb up to 40 centimeters (16 inches) tall, producing a woody taproot. The leaves are spatula-shaped and up to 10 cm (4 inches) long near the bottom of the plant but narrower and shorter farther up the stem. Flower heads sometimes can have as many as 170 white ray florets surrounding numerous yellow disc florets.

References

External links
Photo of herbarium specimen collected in Nuevo León in 1984
University of Texas, Bio 406C, Erigeron modestus photos

Flora of North America
modestus
Plants described in 1849